Helen Pitts (born May 23, 1974 in Monkton, Maryland) is an American trainer of Thoroughbred racehorses.

Early life
Born on a farm, Helen Pitts' parents were both involved in steeplechase racing. She rode ponies and horses from the time she was a young girl, competing in such things as steeplechase racing, pony racing, and  fox hunting. She is a graduate of Oldfields School, an all-girls boarding and day school, which produces exceptional riders.  She graduated with a degree in business from Villa Julie College.

Training career
After finishing her education, Helen Pitts went to work for thoroughbred trainer Francis Campitelli where she stayed for several years before joining flat racing trainer, Kenneth McPeek. She eventually became McPeek's assistant-trainer and when he decided to leave the business for a time, she became head trainer on July 1, 2005.  A resident of Louisville, Kentucky, she got her first win there three days later at Churchill Downs. In October, she won the Queen Elizabeth II Challenge Cup Stakes which was not just her first Grade I win, but marked the first-ever Grade I win by a female trainer at Keeneland Race Course.

Achievements
Among Helen Pitts' other successes, she is the trainer of Einstein with whom she won the 2006 and 2008 Gulfstream Park Turf Handicap, the 2008 Turf Classic Stakes and then defeated Commentator in winning the Clark Handicap.  Notably too, the two-time American Horse of the Year Curlin was conditioned for racing by Helen Pitts for owner, Midnight Cry Stable. Unraced at age two, Pitts got the colt through physical problems and in February 2007 she saddled the three-year-old for his first win at Gulfstream Park in Florida. Two hours after Curlin's impressive 12¾ length win, the colt was sold for $3.5 million to a racing partnership who turned him over to trainer, Steve Asmussen.

Personal life
On September 5, 2008, Helen Pitts married Greg Blasi, whose brother Scott Blasi is Steve Asmussen's assistant trainer.

References
 Helen Pitts at the NTRA
 Biography for Helen Pitts at Keeneland
2008 Video biography of Helen Pitts at Bloodhorse.com

1974 births
Living people
American female horse trainers
People from Monkton, Maryland
Stevenson University alumni
Horse trainers from Louisville, Kentucky
21st-century American women